Stargate School, also called Stargate Charter School, is a charter school for gifted and talented children in Thornton, Colorado, in the Adams 12 Five Star Schools District in Adams County, Colorado, in the United States. It was founded in 1994, and teaches children from kindergarten to 12th grade. The name Stargate combines "Star" from the name of the school district with the initial letters of "gifted and talented education".

History 
The school opened on August 29, 1994. It is the largest charter school in the state of Colorado; it is also the only one to require a test of intelligence for admission.

In November 2014, Standard and Poor's changed its rating of Stargate School's bond debt from "stable" to "negative", citing the school's "weak operations" and "insufficient annual debt  service coverage" as reasons; however it maintained unchanged at BBB its issuer credit rating for the bonds.

Since then, the school has received at least 8 civil rights complaints.

There have also been charges of sexual harassment by a teacher and two other cases resulting in federal monitoring.

Activities 
Students participate in the Adroit Program, which is "designed to support the academic, social, emotional, creative and post-secondary needs of gifted students."

Demographics
In the 2018-2019 school year, the school had 1,393 students, of which 62.5% were white, 19.7% Asian, 10.4% Hispanic or Latino, 0.6% black or African-American, 0.4% American Indian or Alaska Native, and 6.5% two or more races. 63.8% are classified as gifted.

References

Charter schools in Colorado
Gifted education
Schools in Adams County, Colorado
Public elementary schools in Colorado
Educational institutions established in 1994
1994 establishments in Colorado